Sibulele Cecilia Holweni (born 28 April 2001) is a South African soccer player who plays as a midfielder for Sophakama/HPC and the South Africa women's national team.

International career
Holweni made her senior debut on 12 May 2019 in a 0–3 friendly loss to the United States. On 9 November 2020, Holweni scored five goals in the team's 7–0 win over Comoros in Group A of the 2020 COSAFA Women's Championship. South Africa finished at the top of their group and advanced to the knockout stage.

References

External links
 

2001 births
Living people
South African women's soccer players
Women's association football midfielders
South Africa women's international soccer players
2019 FIFA Women's World Cup players